Dux is a Polish classical recording label. It was founded in 1992 by sound engineers Małgorzata Polańska and Lech Tołwiński.

The label specialises in Polish artists and Polish composers. Many DUX recordings are premiere recordings, such as Karol Kurpiński's opera Zamek na Czorsztynie. The label is the associate record label of Wratislavia Cantans festival and of the Warsaw Chamber Opera.

References

External links
Dux.pl

Classical music record labels
Polish record labels
Record labels established in 1992
Polish companies established in 1992